Turnpike Diaries is the second album by the Norwegian band The Getaway People. It was originally scheduled to be released in June 2000, but ultimately was not released until July 18 of the same year. The album's first song, Six Pacs, was used as the theme song for the TV series Young Americans.  The track "Good Life" was featured in the US sitcom, Malcolm in the Middle. The album’s second track “There She Goes” was featured in the critically acclaimed 2000 cheerleading comedy film Bring It On.

Track listing
 "Six Pacs" – 3:56
 "There She Goes" – 4:16
 "Come Love Me" – 4:24
 "Deceived by an Angel" – 4:19
 "Sleepwalkin'" – 3:35
 "All About It" – 3:33
 "Soi Cowboy" – 3:40
 "Change" – 3:47
 "Good Life" – 3:30
 "Open Your Mind" – 3:58
 "S.G.M.L." - (hidden track)

Bonus tracks
 "Track 11" – 4:53 (Longer version of Six Pacs)
 "Track 12" – 3:43

Personnel
 Darryl Jenifer - Vocals
 Anthony Kadleck - Trumpet
 Mark Pender - Trumpet
 Boyd Tinsley - Violin
 Steven Wolf - Drum Programming
 Rahzel - Sound Effects
 Tom Coyne - Mastering
 John Gamble - Producer
 Dante Ross - Producer
 Tovi Rodriguez - Engineer, Assistant Engineer
 Cyrille Taillandier - Assistant Engineer
 Nick Sansano - Accordion, Producer, Engineer, Mixing
 Torbjorn Solum - Engineer
 Jamey Staub - Engineer, Mixing
 Katrin Thomas - Photography

References 

2000 albums
The Getaway People albums
Albums produced by Dante Ross
Albums produced by John Gamble (record producer)